Coop is a Hungarian supermarket chain and buying group with about 5000 stores. In 2015, it became the second largest retail chain in Hungary.

References

External links 
 Coop 

Supermarkets of Hungary
Retail companies established in 1979
Hungarian brands
Hungarian companies established in 1979